Michael Paul Decker Sr. (born December 18, 1944) is a former member of the North Carolina House of Representatives who represented the 94th district, including constituents in Forsyth County. A former teacher from Walkertown, North Carolina, Decker served 10 terms in the state House, ending with the 2003-2004 session. He was born in Red Bud, Illinois.

Bribery scandal
Just before the opening of the 2003–2004 legislative session, Decker, an outspoken conservative, switched from the Republican Party to the Democratic Party. This led to a 60–60 split in the House, producing a power-sharing arrangement between the two parties. Prior to his switch, the Republicans had a 61-59 majority, and therefore were set to control the state House. Shortly before the 2004 elections, Decker switched back to the Republican Party. He was defeated in the 2004 Republican primary by Larry R. Brown of Kernersville who went on to win the general election.

In August 2006, Decker pleaded guilty in federal court to receiving $50,000 in cash and checks as well as a legislative job for his son, all in exchange for supporting Democrat Jim Black for the Speaker of the House position (although Black was not mentioned by name in Decker's federal plea deal). The bribe was made in the form of an envelope containing $38,000 in blank checks from Black's fellow North Carolina optometrists, plus $12,000 in cash from an undisclosed source. The envelope was transferred to Decker by a Democratic member of the House, at a Salisbury, North Carolina, IHOP restaurant. Black's office has said that at some point in 2002, Decker met Jim Black at the IHOP in Salisbury to talk. Black maintained that the $50,000 was campaign funding support from the House Leader to a new Democratic Party member. Decker maintained it was a bribe for him to switch parties so that Black could remain Speaker of the House. In 2007, Black pleaded guilty (but did not actually admit guilt) to essentially what Decker alleged.

On April 27, 2007, Decker was sentenced to four years in prison and a $50,000 fine for his involvement in the scheme.  The sentence was twice what the prosecution was seeking. U.S. District Court Judge James C. Dever III called the scheme "an epic betrayal." He reported to a federal prison in South Carolina in September 2007.

Recent electoral history

2004

2002

2000

References

External links

|-

|-

Living people
Politicians convicted of extortion under color of official right
Politicians convicted of mail and wire fraud
Members of the North Carolina House of Representatives
1944 births
North Carolina politicians convicted of crimes
North Carolina Democrats
North Carolina Republicans
21st-century American politicians
People from Red Bud, Illinois
People from Forsyth County, North Carolina